Ural Locomotives is a railway engineering company formed as a joint venture between Sinara Transport Machines and Siemens in 2010. The manufacturing facilities are based at the Ural Railway Engineering Plant in Verkhnyaya Pyshma, which was incorporated into the Sinara Group in 2004.

In October 2004 the plant began collaboration with RZD with the aim of production of electric freight locomotives.

History
The Ural Railway Engineering Plant was formed to locate a DC electric freight locomotive production site within Russian territory; formerly, during the Soviet era DC electric locomotive production in the USSR had been located in Tbilisi in Georgia.

Initially the plant was involved in the upgrading of electric locomotives of type VL11 (ВЛ11), by 2006 the plant had produced the first unit of electric locomotive 2ES6 (2ЭС6), which was certified for use by 2008. By 2009 production capacity for up to 60 twin-unit locomotives per year had been installed.

In 2010 a joint venture with Siemens (49% Siemens holding) named ООО "Уральские локомотивы" (Ural Locomotives) was formed to produce electric freight locomotives utilising asynchronous traction. The Sinara Group production facilities in Russia were to be based at the factory in Verkhnyaya Pyshma. The joint venture included a technology transfer agreement, with electrical traction components manufactured at Siemens' St. Petersburg plant "Сименс Электропривод". The locomotive produced as a result of the venture were the 2ES10 (2ЭС10) type. The first 2ES10 unit was produced in early 2011.

References

External links
 Official

Locomotive manufacturers of Russia
Russian brands
Sinara Group
Siemens
Companies based in Sverdlovsk Oblast